Pennsylvania Route 117 (PA 117) is a  state route in Lebanon County, Pennsylvania. Its southern terminus is at an interchange with U.S. Route 322 (US 322)/PA 72 in Cornwall. Its northern terminus is at US 422 in Palmyra. PA 117 heads west from US 322/PA 72 through forested areas, passing through Mount Gretna before forming a short concurrency with PA 241 in Colebrook. From here, the route heads northwest and intersects US 322 near Campbelltown. PA 117 continues north through agricultural areas to Palmyra, where it reaches its northern terminus. The route is a two-lane undivided road its entire length. PA 117 was originally designated in 1928 between PA 5 (now US 322) in Campbelltown and US 22 (now US 422) in Palmyra along Palmyra Road and South Railroad Street. PA 820 was designated between PA 241 in Colebrook and PA 5 near Campbelltown while PA 853 was designated between Mount Gretna and PA 72 west of Cornwall. PA 117 was moved to its current alignment by 1946, replacing all of PA 820 and PA 853.

Route description

PA 117 begins at an interchange with the US 322/PA 72 freeway in the borough of Cornwall in Lebanon County, heading west as a two-lane undivided road. East of this interchange, Ironmaster Road continues into Cornwall. From this point, the route heads west into West Cornwall Township and runs southwest through forested areas in the South Mountain range parallel to the Conewago Creek and Lebanon Valley Rail Trail, which run to the north of the road. The road curves west and southwest again, passing to the north of the community of Mount Gretna Heights. PA 117 runs near the northwestern border of the borough of Mount Gretna as it passes between wooded residential areas to the southeast and Conewago Lake to the northwest, with the name becoming Mt. Gretna Road. The road enters South Londonderry Township and winds west through more forests, running parallel to the Conewago Creek and eventually the Lebanon Valley Rail Trail. In the community of Colebrook, the route turns north onto Mt. Wilson Road, crossing the rail trail, and passes homes before it comes to an intersection with PA 241. At this point, PA 241 turns north for a concurrency with PA 117, and the two routes head northwest across the creek and through farm fields.

PA 117 splits from PA 241 by heading west on South Forge Road, passing through a mix of farmland and woodland with some homes. The road curves northwest and runs through forested areas with some fields, passing to the southwest of a wooded residential neighborhood. The route passes through a corner of South Annville Township before it continues back into South Londonderry Township and passes through farmland with some trees and homes. PA 117 turns north and passes near residential subdivisions and some farms before it comes to a junction with US 322 to the east of the community of Campbelltown. Past this intersection, the route heads through agricultural areas with some residential development to the west of the road, intersecting Northside Drive at a roundabout. The road passes to the east of the Reigle Field airport and continues through farmland with some development as it enters North Londondery Township. PA 117 heads into residential areas and turns to the north-northwest, crossing into the borough of Palmyra. The route passes more homes before it reaches its northern terminus at US 422 in a commercial area. Past this intersection, the road continues north as unnumbered North Forge Road.

History

When Pennsylvania first legislated routes in 1911, present-day PA 117 was not given a route number. PA 117 was designated in 1928 to run from PA 5 (now US 322) in Campbelltown north to US 22 (now US 422) in Palmyra, following Palmyra Road and South Railroad Street while PA 853 was designated to run from Mount Gretna east to PA 72 west of Cornwall.  By 1930, PA 820 was designated to run from PA 241 north of Colebrook northwest to PA 5 east of Campbelltown. At this time, all three routes were paved. By 1946, PA 117 was realigned to its current alignment between PA 72 on the western border of Cornwall and US 422 in Palmyra, replacing the PA 820 and PA 853 designations in their entirety. In 1963, the southern terminus at US 322/PA 72 was converted to an interchange as part of upgrading US 322/PA 72 to a freeway. On July 26, 2011, a roundabout opened at Northside Drive in South Londonderry Township; this was the first roundabout in Lebanon County.

Major intersections

See also

References

External links

Pennsylvania Highways: PA 117

117
Transportation in Lebanon County, Pennsylvania